Donnacha Fahy (born 1979 in Clonmel, County Tipperary) is an Irish sportsperson.   He plays hurling with his local club St. Mary's (Tipperary) and was a member of the Tipperary GAA senior inter-county team in the 1990s and 2000s, winning All-Ireland and National Hurling League honours with his native-county.

References

1976 births
Living people
Loughmore-Castleiney hurlers
People from Clonmel
St Mary's (Tipperary) hurlers
Tipperary inter-county hurlers
All-Ireland Senior Hurling Championship winners